Juliet Sorensen (born 1972/1973) is a clinical professor of law at Northwestern University School of Law. She directs the Northwestern Access to Health Project, an interdisciplinary global health program.

Early life
Born to Theodore C. Sorensen, former special counsel to President John F. Kennedy, and Gillian M. Sorensen of the United Nations Foundation,
Sorensen graduated from Princeton University and Columbia Law School.

Career
Between 1995 and 1997, Sorensen volunteered with the Peace Corps in Morocco.

She served as assistant U.S. attorney in Chicago from 2003 to 2010. She prosecuted City of Chicago inspectors as part of Operation Crooked Code, a bribery investigation into the Chicago building and zoning departments. She prosecuted Jean-Marie Vianney ("Zuzu") Mudahinyuka, a leader of the Rwandan genocide, in a case cited as a success of the U.S. Immigration and Customs Enforcement No Safe Haven initiative against human rights violators.

In March 2009, the United States Court of Appeals for the Seventh Circuit, in a unanimous panel opinion written by Judge Richard Posner, found that Sorensen had engaged in prosecutorial misconduct and made "a series of improper statements" which the Court labeled "false and misleading," in the trial court case of U.S. v. Farinella, which was appealed as 558 F.3d 695.
A jury had found a Chicago businessman guilty of fraud and misbranding for relabeling 1.6 million bottles of salad dressing to extend their "best when purchased by" date, then reselling the bottles. Posner found that although relabeling "best when purchased by" dates was not a crime, Sorensen's improper argument would have required reversal in any case.

Personal life
Sorensen married economist Benjamin Jones on August 19, 2000.

See also
 Comprehensive planning
 Interahamwe
 Operation Crooked Code
 Peace Corps
 Rwandan genocide

Notes

Living people
American people of Danish descent
American people of Russian-Jewish descent
Princeton University alumni
Columbia Law School alumni
Northwestern University faculty
Illinois lawyers
Peace Corps volunteers
Year of birth missing (living people)